hi
The list of sea spiders of South Africa is a list of species that form a part of the pycnogonid (Class Pycnogonida) fauna of South Africa. The list follows the SANBI listing on iNaturalist, and does not always agree with WoRMS for distribution.

Order Pantopoda

Suborder Eupantopodida

Superfamily Ascorhynchoidea

Family Ammotheidae

Achelia barnardi Stock, 1959 – endemic
Achelia brevicauda (Loman, 1904) – endemic
Achelia nana (Loman, 1908)
Achelia quadridentata (Hodgson, 1910)
Ammothella indica Stock, 1954
Ammothella setacea (Helfer, 1938) – endemic 
Cilunculus bifidus (Stock, 1968) – endemic
Cilunculus sewelli Calman, 1938
Nymphopsis cuspidata Hodgson, 1910 – endemic
Nymphopsis varipes Stock, 1962 – endemic
Tanystylum brevipes (Hoek, 1881) 
Tanystylum ornatum Flynn, 1928
Tanystylum thermophilum Barnard, 1946 – endemic

Family Ascorhynchidae
Ascorhynchus breviscapus Stock, 1968
Ascorhynchus inflatus Stock, 1963
Ascorhynchus ornatus (Helfer, 1938)
Boehmia chelata (Bohm, 1879) – endemic
Boehmia longirostris Stock, 1957 – endemic			
Boehmia tuberosa Möbius, 1902 – endemic	
Nymphonella lambertensis Stock, 1959

Superfamily Ascorhynchoidea family incertae sedis
Hannonia spinipes Stock, 1956 – endemic
Hannonia typica Hoek, 1881
Queubus jamesanus Barnard, 1946 – endemic

Superfamily Colossendeidoidea

Family Colossendeidae

Subfamily Colossendeinae

Colossendeis angusta Sars, 1877
Colossendeis colossea Wilson, 1881
Colossendeis curtirostris Stock, 1963 – endemic
Colossendeis macerrima Wilson, 1881
Colossendeis megalonyx Hoek, 1881
Colossendeis minuta Hoek, 1881
Colossendeis oculifera Stock, 1963 – endemic

Subfamily Hedgpethiinae
Hedgpethia magnirostris Arnaud & Child, 1988 – endemic
Rhopalorhynchus gracillimus Carpenter, 1907
Rhopalorhynchus kroeyeri Wood-Mason, 1873

Suborder Stiripasterida

Family Austrodecidae
Pantopipetta armata Arnaud & Child, 1988 – endemic
Pantopipetta auxiliata Stock, 1968
Pantopipetta bilobata Arnaud & Child, 1988 – endemic
Pantopipetta capensis (Barnard, 1946) – endemic
Pantopipetta longituberculata (Turpaeva, 1955)

Superfamily Nymphonoidea

Family Callipallenidae
Callipallene africana Arnaud & Child, 1988 – endemic
Callipallene phantoma (Dohrn, 1881)
Callipallene vexator Stock, 1956 – endemic
Pallenoides proboscidea Barnard, 1955 – endemic
Parapallene algoae Barnard, 1946 – endemic
Parapallene calmani Flynn, 1928 – endemic
Parapallene hodgsoni Barnard, 1946 
Parapallene invertichelata Arnaud & Child, 1988 – endemic
Parapallene longipes Calman, 1938
Parapallene nierstraszi Loman, 1908
Parapallene spinosa (Möbius, 1902)
Propallene crassimanus Stock, 1959
Propallene dubitans (Hodgson, 1910) – endemic
Propallene magnicollis Stock, 1951 – endemic
Propallene similis Barnard, 1955
Pseudopallene gilchristi Flynn, 1928 (taxon inquirendum Feb 2019)
Safropallene longimana Arnaud & Child, 1988 – endemic

Family Nymphonidae

Nymphon australe Hodgson, 1902
Nymphon barnardi Arnaud & Child, 1988 – endemic
Nymphon bicornum Arnaud & Child, 1988 – endemic
Nymphon comes Flynn, 1928 – endemic
Nymphon crenatiunguis Barnard, 1946 – endemic
Nymphon distensum Möbius, 1902 – endemic
Nymphon granulatum Arnaud & Child, 1988 – endemic
Nymphon laterospinum Stock, 1963
Nymphon lobatum Stock, 1962 – endemic
Nymphon microctenatum Barnard, 1946 – endemic
Nymphon modestum Stock, 1959 – endemic
Nymphon natalense Flynn, 1928 – endemic
Nymphon obesum Arnaud & Child, 1988 – endemic
Nymphon paralobatum Arnaud & Child, 1988 – endemic
Nymphon pedunculatum Arnaud & Child, 1988 – endemic
Nymphon phasmatoides Bohm, 1879 – endemic
Nymphon pilosum Möbius, 1902 – endemic
Nymphon pleodon Stock, 1962 – endemic
Nymphon serratidentatum Arnaud & Child, 1988 – endemic
Nymphon setimanus Barnard, 1946 – endemic
Nymphon signatum Möbius, 1902 – endemic

Family Pallenopsidae
Bathypallenopsis californica (Schimkewitsch, 1893)
Bathypallenopsis longirostris (Wilson, 1881)
Pallenopsis brevidigitata Möbius, 1902
Pallenopsis capensis Barnard, 1946 – endemic
Pallenopsis crosslandi Carpenter, 1910
Pallenopsis intermedia Flynn, 1928
Pallenopsis ovalis Loman, 1908
Pallenopsis persimillis Stock, 1956

Superfamily Phoxichilidoidea

Family Endeidae, subfamily Endeinae
Endeis clipeata Möbius, 1902
Endeis mollis (Carpenter, 1904)

Family Phoxichilidiidae
Anoplodactylus aculeatus Möbius, 1902 – endemic
Anoplodactylus capensis(Flynn, 1928) – endemic
Anoplodactylus lappa(Böhm, 1879) – nomen dubium
Anoplodactylus typhlops Sars, 1888
Anoplodactylus unilobus Stock, 1959 – endemic

Superfamily Pycnogonoidea

Family Pycnogonidae
Pycnogonum (Nulloviger) africanum Calman, 1938
Pycnogonum angulirostrum Stock, 1959 – endemic
Pycnogonum cataphractum Möbius, 1902 – endemic
Pycnogonum crassirostrum Sars, 1888
Pycnogonum forte Flynn, 1928 – endemic
Pycnogonum microps Loman 1904 – endemic
Pycnogonum nodulosum Dohrn, 1881
Pycnogonum portus  Barnard, 1946 – endemic
Pycnogonum (Retroviger) pusillum Dohrn, 1881

References

Marine biodiversity of South Africa
Pycnogonids
South Africa, sea spiders
South African animal biodiversity lists